Joseph Beuys Sculpture Park is a park located on the campus of the University of Maryland Baltimore County (UMBC) in Baltimore County, Maryland, inspired by Joseph Beuys' extensive 7000 Oaks tree planting project. The original project transformed the sidewalks and landscape of Kassel, Germany, with the planting of 7,000 oak trees between 1982 and 1987. As part of the Tree Partnership, over 200 trees were planted among Patterson Park, Carroll Park, and Wyman Park in Baltimore.

The Sculpture Park is managed by the Center for Art, Design and Visual Culture at UMBC.

Location

The Joseph Beuys Sculpture Park is located on the UMBC campus between Administration Drive and Commons Drive, along Hilltop Circle. There are multiple paths (paved and unpaved) that run through the park, which allows for student access.

External links
 7000 Oaks Foundation Website
Google Maps Location and Streetview

References

University of Maryland, Baltimore County
Catonsville, Maryland
Joseph Beuys
Sculpture gardens, trails and parks in the United States
Tourist attractions in Baltimore County, Maryland
Parks in Baltimore County, Maryland
2001 establishments in Maryland